In the 2018–19 season, MC Alger competed in the Ligue 1 for the 48th season, as well as the Algerian Cup.

Pre-season

Mid-season

Overview

{| class="wikitable" style="text-align: center"
|-
!rowspan=2|Competition
!colspan=8|Record
!rowspan=2|Started round
!rowspan=2|Final position / round
!rowspan=2|First match
!rowspan=2|Last match
|-
!
!
!
!
!
!
!
!
|-
| Ligue 1

| 
| 6th
| 13 August 2018
| 26 May 2019
|-
| Algerian Cup

| Round of 64
| Round of 16
| 20 December 2018
| 23 January 2019
|-
| Champions League

| colspan=2| Group stage
| 17 July 2018
| 28 August 2018
|-
| Club Championship

| First round
| Quarter-finals
| 9 August 2018
| 16 February 2019
|-
! Total

Ligue 1

League table

Results summary

Results by round

Matches

Algerian Cup

Champions League

Group stage

Group B

Club Championship Cup

First round

Second round

Quarter-finals

Squad information

Playing statistics

|-

|-
! colspan=14 style=background:#dcdcdc; text-align:center| Players transferred out during the season

Goalscorers

Squad list
As of August 13, 2018

Transfers

In

Out

Notes

References

2018-19
MC Alger